Operation Dolfyn was a military operation in Angola from  May 1983 by the South African Defence Force (SADF) during the Angolan Civil War and South African Border War.

Background
The aim of the operation locate and destroy the People's Liberation Army of Namibia (PLAN) Eastern Command headquarters which was thought to be north of Cuvelai as well any other bases in the area. The operation took place during May and June 1983 and consisted of many small contacts. 

Forces were divided into Task Force West under command of Col. Linford and Task Force East was under command of Col. Phillip Lloyd.  Each task force was allocated an Air Force MOAT with each MOAT having two Alouette Gunships plus one Alouette troop carrier helicopter under their command.

The operation ended at the beginning of July. The town of Cuvelai would again be the target of the SADF during Operation Askari at the end of December 1983.

Order of Battle for SADF
The SADF units consisted of elements from:
 Three companies of 32 Battalion, 
4 SAI, 
Regiment Groot Karoo.
 Reserve: 
 Two Companies of 44 Parachute Brigade
 Mobile force from 61 Mechanised Battalion

Notes and references

Notes

Citations

Bibliography

Further reading
 

Conflicts in 1983
Military history of Angola
Cross-border operations of South Africa
Battles and operations of the South African Border War
1983 in Angola
1983 in South Africa
May 1983 events in Africa
June 1983 events in Africa